Kottler is a surname. Notable people with the surname include:

 Friedrich Kottler (1886–1965), Austrian theoretical physicist
 Moses Kottler (1896–1977), South African painter and sculptor
 Martin Kottler (1910–1989), American football running back
 Howard Kottler (1930–1989), American ceramist, conceptual artist, and professor of ceramics

Other uses 
 10416 Kottler, an asteroid named after Herbert Kottler

See also 
 Kotler
 Kotter (disambiguation)
 Cottler